East York Collegiate Institute (East York CI, EYCI, or East York), formerly East York High School is a public high-school in Toronto, Ontario, Canada. It is located in the former borough of East York at the corner of Coxwell and Cosburn Avenues. It was part of the East York Board of Education until 1998 when the board became part of the Toronto District School Board. Its motto is "Honos Per Ministrium" (Honour through Service).

History
Established in 1927 and designed by architect George Roper Gouinlock, son of George Wallace Gouinlock, the Collegiate Gothic school was originally known as East York High School, but it soon merged with a local vocational school and extended the building capacity; it gained its current name a decade later. Additions such as the auditorium, double gym, and classrooms were added during the 1950s and 1960s.

In 1988, East York Collegiate received major renovations such as the new wing in the north and south, and a second double gym costed at $9.9-million in a similar manner to Scarborough's R.H. King Collegiate Institute during their renovations in 1976. Save for the entrance arch, the original school and components of the building were demolished and now serve as a parking lot. The modern school was designed by architects Page and Steele.

In 2002, East York Collegiate Institute adopted a school uniform policy.

School life

Sports & Athletics
EYCI has an athletics program, with strong showings by its Senior Boys' Football team, Senior Boys' Hockey team, Varsity Girls' Hockey team (who made it to OFSAA in 2008–09 and 2011–12), as well as both the Junior and Senior Boys' Soccer squads. Historically from the 1950s to the 1980s, the school was a perennial powerhouse in Canadian-rules Football (York League) and Baseball (TSSAA). The Senior Boys Cross Country team also qualified for OFSAA in the Fall of 2009 and 2010. The Girls Junior Basketball team won the city championship in 2009–10.

East York is one of the few high schools to have a Flag football team. The Varsity Girls' Flag Football team has been very successful since forming in 2007, winning silver in their first year and gold for the next two years in the TDSSAA Regional finals, making the TSSAA City Championships during their 2008 and 2009 seasons, winning gold and silver respectively.

Co-curricular programs

Robotics
Since 2002, East York Collegiate Institute has been involved with the FIRST Robotics Competition FIRST Robotics, an international competition in which professionals and high school students are teamed together to solve an engineering design problem in an intense yet cooperative way. In 2002, the East York FIRST Robotics Team won the Highest Rookie Seed Award in recognition of the Highest Placed Rookie of Robotics in Canada [7]. In 2011, East York's Team 907, placed in the Semi-Finals at the Greater Toronto Area Regional and placed twice again in the Semi-Finals at Greater Toronto Regional East and the Greater Toronto Regional West in 2012. East York also won the Creativity Award for their 2012 Robot.

Outreach
East York's Outreach initiative emphasizes local and national opportunities that take an experiential learning and community service approach. East York's Team 907 has many growing outreach projects in Toronto including mentoring the younger Robotics Teams located in the Greater Toronto Area.

Middle School feeders
Feeder schools for East York Collegiate include Cosburn Middle School, Westwood Middle School (formerly Westwood Junior High), D.A. Morrison Middle School (formerly Oak Park Junior High) and G.A. Brown Middle School (formerly St. Clair Junior High).

Notable alumni
 Sharon Bruneau, bodybuilder and actress
 Rich Butler, former baseball player
 Rob Butler, former baseball player
 Ben Chin, news anchor
 David Collenette, former Cabinet Minister
 Chris Diamantopoulos, actor
 Mike Del Grande, former Toronto City councillor
 Tony Featherstone, former NHL player
 Mike Holmes, home contractor and television show host
 Argiris Karras, actor
 Chris Kotsopoulos, former NHL player
 Peter Mahovlich, former NHL player
 Nelson Martin, former CFL football player and coach
 Joe Motiki, TV actor, host and radio announcer
 Cam Newton, former NHL goalie 
 Tim Sims, actor and comedian
 Glenn Smith, former NHL player
 Still Life Still, indie rock band
 Barry Stroud (philosopher)
 Brandon Tanev, NHL hockey player
 Christopher Tanev,  NHL hockey player
 Steph Tolev, comedian
 Nick Volpe, former football player
 Elizabeth Weir, lawyer and former leader of the New Brunswick NDP
 Mike Wilmot, comedian
 Theo Zagar, former professional soccer player

See also
 List of high schools in Ontario

References

External links

 East York Collegiate Institute
 TDSB Profile

High schools in Toronto
Schools in the TDSB
Educational institutions established in 1927
1927 establishments in Ontario